Doug Dean (born December 31, 1960) is an American politician from the state of Colorado.

Dean was born in Story City, Iowa and attended Tennessee Temple University and the University of Tennessee at Chattanooga. A Republican, he represented the 18th district in the Colorado House of Representatives from 1994 to 2003, and served as House Majority leader from 1999 to 2001 and Speaker of the House from 2001 to 2003. Dean later served as Colorado Insurance Commissioner from 2003 to 2005, and as Director of the Colorado Public Utilities Commission from February 2005 until his retirement in December 2022.

References

Living people
1960 births
Republican Party members of the Colorado House of Representatives
Speakers of the Colorado House of Representatives